Waxhaw Branch is a  long 2nd order tributary to Lanes Creek in Union County, North Carolina.  This is the only stream of this name in the United States.

Course
Waxhaw Branch rises about 5 miles southeast of Rock Rest, North Carolina.  Waxhaw Branch then flows generally southeast with curves to meet Lanes Creek about 1.5 miles southeast of Allens Crossroads, North Carolina.

Watershed
Waxhaw Branch drains  of area, receives about 48.4 in/year of precipitation, has a topographic wetness index of 430.40 and is about 42% forested.

References

Rivers of North Carolina
Rivers of Union County, North Carolina
Tributaries of the Pee Dee River